Varkaneh (also Romanized as Varkāneh) is a village in Alvandkuh-e Sharqi Rural District, in the Central District of Hamadan County, Hamadan Province, Iran. At the 2006 census, its population was 848, in 196 families.

Name 
The name Vārkaneh is ultimately derived from Old Iranian *Varkānaka-, itself from Proto-Iranian *wr̥kāna-, and ultimately sharing an etymology with Varkāna, the Old Persian name of the province of Hyrcania.

Notable people 

 Tofy Mussivand

References 

Populated places in Hamadan County